The Bardufoss concentration camp was located in Northern Norway in the municipality of Målselv. During the occupation of Norway by Nazi Germany, the Nazi authorities established a "concentration camp in the town of Bardufoss," as an annex to the Grini concentration camp. It opened in March 1944 to alleviate overflowing in other camps, particularly Grini and the Falstad concentration camp. Situated in a cold climate, it was notorious for its hard work regime, sparse rations, and inadequate shelter. It is estimated that some 800 prisoners passed through the camp, and when liberated about 550 were incarcerated.

See also

 Glossary of Nazi Germany
 The Holocaust
 List of books about Nazi Germany
 List of concentration and internment camps
 List of Nazi-German concentration camps
 Nazi concentration camps
 Nazi Party
 Nazi songs
 World War II

References

Nazi concentration camps in Norway
1944 establishments in Norway
Organizations established in 1944

ru:Бардуфосс (концентрационный лагерь)